Bodhamalai or Bodamalai is a hill in Namakkal district of Tamil Nadu.

Geography
Bodhamalai is an offshoot of Kolli Hills running 12 km in the East-West direction between Jarugu and Kolli Hills. The height ranges  from 800 meters to 1200 meters.

Keelur, Melur, Gedamalai are some hill villages of Bodhamalai.
Bodhamalai is a parts of Eastern ghats in Salem district and Namakkal district of Tamil Nadu. The Kolli hill is located forty kilometres south from Bodhamalai. The Yercaud or Shevaroy Hills of Salem district is located seventy kilometres north from Bodhamalai. The nearest town Rasipuram is located twenty kilometres South from Bodhamalai.
Salem is located forty four kilometres north from Bodhamalai. The district capital Namakkal is located forty eight kilometres south from Bodhamalai. Mettala is located twenty one kilometres east from Bodhamalai. Vennandur is located thirty kilometres west from Bodhamalai.
Here the hill tribes live very little. All of them are displaced from Kolli hill and live here. No bus facility. You have to go for a walk.

Herbal plants
Several species of herbal plants grow in Bodhamalai. The local people sell herbal leaves, roots, tuber, stem, crust of herbal plant.

Demographics
Tribals live in Kizhur, Mellur and Kedamalai hamlets. Agriculture and rearing live stocks is their main occupation.

Administration
The area falls under the Rasipuram taluk and in the Rasipuram Assembly constituency in Namakkal district.

References

Eastern Ghats
Hills of Tamil Nadu
Namakkal district